Karine Kazinian (née Kroyan) (8 January 1955 – 6 December 2012) was Ambassador of Armenia to the United Kingdom of Great Britain and Northern Ireland. She attended and graduated from Yerevan State University in 1977. Previously, she worked in the Soviet embassies in Portugal, Africa, and Romania. Karine was appointed Deputy Minister of Foreign Affairs of Armenia in 2009, and on 8 September 2011 she became Ambassador to the United Kingdom.

Karine won the Armenian Medal of Mkhitar Gosh and Romanian Grand Cross Order for Merit. She is survived by a daughter and a son.

References

1955 births
2012 deaths
Diplomats from Yerevan
Ambassadors of Armenia to the United Kingdom
Ambassadors of Armenia to Germany
Ambassadors of Armenia to Romania
21st-century Armenian women politicians
21st-century Armenian politicians
21st-century diplomats
Armenian women diplomats
Soviet women diplomats
Women ambassadors